Azhar Sheikh (born 11 March 1985) is an Indian cricketer. He made his first-class debut for Vidarbha in the 2002–03 Ranji Trophy.

References

External links
 

1985 births
Living people
Indian cricketers
Vidarbha cricketers
Cricketers from Nagpur